Nettilling Lake is a cold freshwater lake located toward the south end of Baffin Island in the Qikiqtaaluk Region, Nunavut, Canada. The Arctic Circle crosses the lake. The lake's name is of Inuktitut origin, coming from the word for the adult ringed seal (netsilak). Franz Boas explored its southern shore in 1884.

Nettilling is the largest lake in Nunavut. It is fed by the second largest lake on Baffin Island, Amadjuak Lake; as well as several other smaller lakes and streams. It empties west via the very shallow Koukdjuak River into Foxe Basin. The eastern half has many small islands and the western half is deeper with no islands. The lake is frozen for most of the year. Ringed seals live in the lake and only three species of fish have been recorded there: the Arctic char as well as the ninespine and three-spined stickleback. The tundra around the lake and south to Amadjuak Lake is important for barren-ground caribou feeding and calving.

Nettilling Lake is the eleventh largest in Canada, being one of the largest lakes entirely within Canada.

See also
List of lakes of Nunavut
List of lakes of Canada

References

 Nettilling Lake, at The Canadian Encyclopedia
 Canada's Polar Environments, Nettilling Lake and Amadjuak Lake

External links
Canada's Polar Environments, Baffin Island map and info

Lakes of Qikiqtaaluk Region
Bodies of water of Baffin Island